This is a list of tropical cyclones, subdivided by basin. See the list of tropical cyclone records for individual records set by individual tropical cyclones.

Lists of Atlantic hurricanes – directory for Atlantic hurricanes north of the equator
 List of retired Atlantic hurricane names
 List of Atlantic–Pacific crossover hurricanes
South Atlantic tropical cyclone – covers tropical cyclones in the Atlantic Ocean south of the equator
List of Pacific hurricanes – listing of Pacific hurricanes east of the International Date Line and north of the equator
List of retired Pacific hurricane names
Typhoon
Pacific typhoon season
List of retired Pacific typhoon names
List of retired Philippine typhoon names
North Indian Ocean cyclone
North Indian Ocean tropical cyclone
South-West Indian Ocean cyclone
South-West Indian Ocean tropical cyclone
Australian region tropical cyclone
Australian region tropical cyclone
List of retired Australian region cyclone names
List of Western Australia tropical cyclones
South Pacific cyclone
South Pacific tropical cyclone
List of retired South Pacific cyclone names

See also 

List of natural disasters by death toll
Tropical cyclone naming
List of tornadoes spawned by tropical cyclones
List of the most intense tropical cyclones
List of wettest tropical cyclones by country
List of unnamed tropical cyclones

External links